Yu Wenxia (born 6 August 1989) is a Chinese actress, television host, singer, model and beauty queen. She won Miss World 2012 in Ordos City, Inner Mongolia, the second Chinese national to do so after Zhang Zilin in 2007.

Early life and education
The second of two daughters to farming parents, she was born on 6 August 1989 in Shangzhi, Heilongjiang in northeast China. Yu dreamt of becoming a singer as a child, enjoying classes in music and nature. She completed a four-year university course in Chinese Folk Music at Harbin University. She is currently studying at Harvard University in the United States.

Career

Miss China 2012
On 30 June 2012, Yu was crowned Miss China 2012 at the Jinhai Lake Resort in Beijing.

Miss World 2012
On 18 August 2012, Yu won the 2012 Miss World pageant held in Dongsheng Fitness Center Stadium, Ordos City, Inner Mongolia, China. She was also named Miss Talent, where she performed her winning talent—Chinese folk song on stage during the final.

When asked how she felt at winning the Miss World crown, she replied:

Surprised and very happy. Winning Miss World is a big responsibility; there is so much to learn. I really admire Zhang Zilin, my country's first Miss World winner, I hope to follow her example, but at the same time make my own mark. I very much look forward to working with the Miss World Organisation sharing my compassion and love and helping to improve the lives of many people throughout my year of reign.

During her reign as Miss World, Yu traveled to the United Kingdom, Italy, France, South Africa, India, Australia, Philippines, Thailand, Indonesia, Russia, United States, Haiti, Brazil, Turkey, Ghana, Hungary, Ukraine and China.

Miss World 2013
On the grand final of Miss World 2013, Yu performed "Tanzette" along with the Talent competition winner and runner-up, Vania Larissa from Indonesia and Erin Holland from Australia.

She appears in the film The Transporter Refueled.

Notes and references

External links

 Yu Wenxia instagram
 Yu Wenxia Weibo

1989 births
21st-century Chinese actresses
Chinese beauty pageant winners
Living people
Miss World 2012 delegates
Miss World winners
Actresses from Harbin